Gordon Arthur Drillon (October 23, 1913 – September 23, 1986) was a Canadian ice hockey player. He was born in Moncton, New Brunswick, Canada. From 1936 through to 1942 he was part of one of the NHL's most prolific scoring lines as a member of the Toronto Maple Leafs. He won a Stanley Cup during the 1941–42 season, and was inducted into the Hockey Hall of Fame in 1975.

Playing career
Drillon played seven seasons in the NHL, six of those with Toronto and one with the Montreal Canadiens. A winger noted for his deadly accurate shot, he created a specific style of play that made him a leading scorer. Drillon's strong frame made it difficult for opposing defencemen to clear him from the front of the net. He was able to securely park himself in front of the opposing netminder to re-direct shots or pick up rebounds. This style of play would earn him a league scoring title in the 1937–38 season. Future stars such as Phil Esposito, Dino Ciccarelli, and Dave Andreychuk emulated his innovative style with great success.

Traded to the Montreal Canadiens for the 1943 season, Drillon finished second on the team in goals scored. At season's end, Drillon cut short his hockey career and joined the Royal Canadian Air Force, serving for the remainder of World War II. After the war, he worked as a hockey coach in Grand Falls-Windsor, Newfoundland in the 1948/49 season. Drillon later returned to his native New Brunswick where he was employed as a scout for the Maple Leafs, covering the Maritime provinces. He eventually accepted a job with the New Brunswick civil service. In 1975, he was inducted into the Hockey Hall of Fame.

Drillon died in Saint John, New Brunswick, in 1986 and was interred there in the Ocean View Memorial Gardens cemetery.

Career statistics

Regular season and playoffs

Awards
Lady Byng Memorial Trophy (1938)
League Scoring Champion (1938)
First All-Star team — (1938, 1939)
Second All-Star team — (1942)

External links
 

1913 births
1986 deaths
Canadian ice hockey left wingers
Canadian military personnel of World War II
Hockey Hall of Fame inductees
Ice hockey people from New Brunswick
New Brunswick Sports Hall of Fame inductees
Lady Byng Memorial Trophy winners
Montreal Canadiens players
National Hockey League scoring leaders (prior to 1947–48)
Ontario Hockey Association Senior A League (1890–1979) players
Pittsburgh Yellow Jackets (EHL) players
Sportspeople from Moncton
Stanley Cup champions
Toronto Maple Leafs players
Toronto Maple Leafs scouts
Toronto Young Rangers players
Valleyfield Braves players